Doubleview is a suburb of Perth, Western Australia in the local government area of the City of Stirling. It was named Doubleview due to its views of both the Indian Ocean to the west and the Darling Range to the east.

Location
Doubleview lies between Scarborough to the west and Innaloo to the east on the heavily trafficked Scarborough Beach Road. It is bordered by Newborough Street to the North, Grand Promenade to the West, Williamstown Road to the South, and Huntriss Road to the East. Its main roads are Sackville Terrace and Scarborough Beach Road.

History
In 1895, the land was occupied by John Daniel Manning (1814-1895), an English-born dairy farmer, shortly before his death. In 1910, a real estate investor called Charles Edgar Stoneman purchased the land and started selling it in subdivisions. He used the same street names used in the center of Perth, leading buyers to believe they were purchasing land there. In 1916, a real estate developer called M. L. Connor purchased the Southern portion of Doubleview and started selling it in subdivisions. After he failed to sell many, it was purchased by a team of real estate developers, Dudley and Dwyer, in 1926. They were the ones who coined the name 'Doubleview.' However, the land subdivisions failed to sell again.

Shortly after the Second World War, the Western Australian government built houses for returning soldiers in the Northern section of Doubleview. Those first houses were built in timber-frame. More recently, houses have been built using brick and tile. It has remained a predominantly residential area.

School
Doubleview contains one state primary school, Doubleview Primary School, located at 203 St Brigid's Terrace.

Churches
The Perth Chinese Christian Church is located at 146 Flamborough Street.
A meeting house of the Church of Jesus Christ of Latter-day Saints is located at 71 Princess Road.
Doubleview Parish of the Catholic Archdiocese of Perth is located in the neighbouring suburb of Woodlands

Public parks
Doubleview contains several public parks:
Bradley Reserve.
Munro Reserve.
Bennett Park.

References

Suburbs of Perth, Western Australia
Suburbs in the City of Stirling